Jürgen Heinrichs (born 21 January 1977) is a German former professional footballer who played as a midfielder.

References

1977 births
Living people
German footballers
Association football midfielders
Eerste Divisie players
SC Fortuna Köln players
1. FC Köln II players
1. FC Kleve players
Fortuna Sittard players
SV Bergisch Gladbach 09 players
German expatriate footballers
German expatriate sportspeople in the Netherlands
Expatriate footballers in the Netherlands